Olho d'Água do Casado is a municipality located in the western of the Brazilian state of Alagoas.

The municipality holds part of the  Rio São Francisco Natural Monument, which protects the spectacular canyons of the São Francisco River between the Paulo Afonso Hydroelectric Complex and the Xingó Dam.

References

Municipalities in Alagoas